Polygrapha is a Neotropical nymphalid butterfly genus in the subfamily Charaxinae.

There are four species in the genus.

Species
 Polygrapha cyanea (Godman & Salvin, 1868)
 Polygrapha suprema (Schaus, 1920)
 Polygrapha tyrianthina (Salvin & Godman, 1868)
 Polygrapha xenocrates (Westwood, 1850)

External links
"Polygrapha Staudinger, [1887]" at Markku Savela's Lepidoptera and Some Other Life Forms

Anaeini
Nymphalidae of South America
Butterfly genera
Taxa named by Otto Staudinger